Pelevikha is a rural locality (a village) in Moseyevskoye Rural Settlement, Totemsky  District, Vologda Oblast, Russia. The population was 61 as of 2002.

Geography 
Pelevikha is located 68 km northwest of Totma (the district's administrative centre) by road. Seredskaya is the nearest rural locality.

References 

Rural localities in Totemsky District